Count Władysław Stanisław Zamoyski (24 March 1803 - 11 January 1868) was a Polish nobleman, politician, and general.

Zamoyski was the owner of estates in Cewków. He  served as aide-de-camp to Grand Duke Constantine, commander-in-chief of the army and de facto viceroy of Congress Poland. He took part in the November Uprising of 1830–1831. Working with Adam Jerzy Czartoryski he became one of the main activists in the Hôtel Lambert group. He emigrated to England, where he represented the interests of Czartoryski's government-in-exile. In 1848–1849 he organized Polish units in Italy, serving with the Sardinian Army to fight against the Austrians (1848–49), and later, in 1855, he led a Polish cavalry division in the Ottoman Army during the Crimean War.

In March 1831, Zamoyski was awarded the Gold Cross of the Virtuti Militari.

He was married to Jadwiga Działyńska and had four children: Władysław Zamoyski, Witold Zamoyski, Maria Zamoyska (1857-1857) and Maria Zamoyska (1860-1937).

He died in 1868 and was buried in Paris.

References

1803 births
1868 deaths
Nobility from Warsaw
Counts of Poland
19th-century Polish politicians
Polish generals in other armies
Polish people of the Crimean War (Turkish side)
Generals of the January Uprising
Activists of the Great Emigration
Wladyslaw
Recipients of the Gold Cross of the Virtuti Militari
Polish diplomats of the January Uprising
Ottoman Army personnel
Military personnel from Warsaw